Ernest Grosjean (18 December 1844 – 28 December 1936) was a French organist and composer.

Biography 
Born in Vagney (Vosges), Ernest Grosjean was the nephew and pupil of Jean-Romary Grosjean, founder and director of the Journal des organistes.

In addition to his uncle, he had successively Henri Hess, Camille-Marie Stamaty and Alexis Chauvet as masters of piano, organ, harmony, music composition and fugue.

He made his debut as organist in the cathedral of Uzès (Gard) in 1864, before competing for the position of organist, and later of maître de chapelle of the Verdun Cathedral, that he held from 1868 until 1935, even though the Jacquot-Jeanpierre organ of Rambervillers (Vosges), built in 1898, was dismantled during the First World War to preserve it. The instrument was rebuilt and inaugurated on 25 March 1935 jointly by the titular master Marcel Dupré and abbot Pierre Camonin who succeeded him in June of the same year.

Grosjean died in Versailles at the age of 92 on 28 December 1936.

Publications 
Grosjean wrote teaching works including a harmony course, which earned him the approval of several eminent composers; a quantity of works for the organ, 30 Verse, 82 Pieces, etc.; works for voices, piano and various instruments.
 Soixante-dix pièces faciles for organ (reprint Musica Rinata, 2007).
 Pièces pour orgue ou harmonium (reprint Armelin Musica, 2007).
 Noël d'alsace et de Lorraine.
 Les anges dans nos campagnes, variations for organ.
 Offertoire O filii et filiæ - pour le temps pascal.
 Marche nuptiale, in the Journal des Organistes, reprinted by abbott Delépine in the Échos Jubilaires des Maîtres de l’Orgue (v. 1908).
 Aria cantabile for organ, in the Journal des Organistes (1880).
 Memento for organ, ed. Combre.

In the séries Les Maîtres Contemporains de l'Orgue (1912) by abbot Joseph Joubert:
 Offertoire bref or Communion Prélude Méthode pour l'accompagnement du chant grégorien, Saint-Laurent-sur-Sèvre: L.-J. Biton (1917).

 Sources 
 Biographical notes published in Joseph Joubert, Maîtres contemporains de l'orgue, volume I, Édition Maurice Senart and Cie, 1912, .

 External links 
 IMSLP Pièces pour orgue ou harmonium.
 Rochester University Méthode pour l'accompagnement du chant grégorien (1917).
 Biographie universelle des musiciens et bibliographie générale de la musique. Publiée sous la direction de François-Joseph Fétis et A. Pougin, (1878), .
 Online Computer Library Center Library of Congress Authority File.
 Vosges et Orgues Notes sur Romary Grosjean.
 Musica et Memoria Le chanoine Pierre Camonin, doyen des organistes français, fête ses 100 ans ! par Denis Havard de La Montagne.
 YouTube Cantabile''.
 Ernest Grosjean, organiste, Dictionnaire des Vosgiens célèbres

French classical organists
French male organists
French male composers
19th-century French composers
20th-century French composers
French Romantic composers
1844 births
People from Vosges (department)
1936 deaths
20th-century French male musicians
19th-century French male musicians
Male classical organists